The Hartford Capitols were a professional basketball team in the Eastern Professional Basketball League (later re-named the Eastern Basketball Association) from 1966 through 1974. The Capitols played on weekends only and played at various venues around the city, including the University of Hartford, Hartford Public High School and Bloomfield High School.

Notable players who played with the Capitols included Gene Conley, Art Heyman and K.C. Jones.

The Capitols went out of business in 1974, shortly after winning their first and only league championship. They were owned by Mark C. Yellin, a local attorney.

Year-by-year

References

Continental Basketball Association teams
Defunct basketball teams in Connecticut
Sports teams in Hartford, Connecticut
Defunct sports teams in Connecticut
Basketball teams established in 1966
Basketball teams disestablished in 1974
1966 establishments in Connecticut
1974 disestablishments in Connecticut